Nystalux is a 1981 role-playing game adventure for Traveller published by Group One.

Plot summary
Nystalux is the fourth in Group One's series of alien worlds, with descriptions of the planet, its inhabitants (an insectoid race known as the Sedas), its fauna and the main cities of Nystalux.

Publication history
Nithus was published in 1981 by Group One as a 12-page book with a color world map.

Reception
William A. Barton reviewed Nystalux in The Space Gamer No. 41. Barton commented that "Nystalux will probably prove useful to some Traveller referees. Those who are a little short on the cash, or who'd rather create their own cultures from scratch rather than have to alter someone else's, may wish to pass on this one."

References

Role-playing game supplements introduced in 1981
Traveller (role-playing game) adventures